Provoke (foaled 1962) was a British Thoroughbred racehorse and sire. In a career which lasted from autumn 1964 until September 1965, he ran seven times and won four races. He won the Classic St Leger as a three-year-old in 1965, defeating Meadow Court by ten lengths. He was later exported to stand as a stallion in the Soviet Union.

Background
Provoke was a bay horse with a narrow white blaze and white socks on his hind feet, bred and owned by Jakie Astor. He was sired by the King George VI and Queen Elizabeth Stakes winner Aureole. His dam, Tantalizer was a good racemare who was placed in the Irish Oaks and the Ribblesdale Stakes and was a half-sister of the outstanding stayer Trelawny. As a descendant of the mare Popinjay, Provoke was a member of the same branch of Thoroughbred family 1-n which produced Swale and Shadeed.

Astor sent the colt into training with Dick Hern at stables in West Ilsley in Berkshire.

Racing career

1964: two-year-old season
Provoke was slow to mature and was not highly tried as a two-year-old. He made his only racecourse appearance in late October, when he finished unplaced in the Theale Plate at Newbury Racecourse.

1965: three-year-old season
Provoke began the 1965 season by finishing fourth in the Glasgow Maiden Stakes at York Racecourse in early May and then finished second in the Shaw Maiden Plate at Newbury later in the month. He was never beaten again. In June, Provoke recorded his first win when taking the Childrey Maiden Stakes over thirteen furlongs at Newbury. He then won the Cranbourn Chase Stakes at Ascot in July and the Melrose Stakes at York in August.

In September, Provoke was sent to Doncaster to contest the St Leger. Provoke was ridden by Joe Mercer and started as a 28/1 outsider in a field of eleven runners. Meadow Court, the winner of the King George VI and Queen Elizabeth Stakes started 4/11 favourite in a race which was run on extremely soft ground. Provoke was well-suited and by the muddy conditions and after taking the lead three furlongs from the finish he pulled clear of the opposition to win by ten lengths. Meadow Court's connections offered no excuses apart from the state of the ground, which was described as the worst for 39 years. The result was described as "one of the biggest upsets in British horse racing history".

Provoke remained in training in 1966, but was afflicted by a viral infection and did not run.

Assessment
Provoke was given a rating of 130 by Timeform in 1965.

In their book A Century of Champions, John Randall and Tony Morris rated Provoke an "average" St Leger winner.

Stud career
In 1966 Provoke was sold and exported to the Soviet Union. He died shortly after his arrival in Russia.

Pedigree

References 

Racehorses bred in the United Kingdom
Racehorses trained in the United Kingdom
1962 racehorse births
Thoroughbred family 1-n
St Leger winners